David “Dave” Holland (born 1 October 1946) is an English jazz double bassist, composer and bandleader who has been performing and recording for five decades. He has lived in the United States for over 40 years.

His extensive discography ranges from solo performances to pieces for big band. Holland runs his own independent record label, Dare2, which he launched in 2005.

Biography
Born in Wolverhampton, England, Holland taught himself how to play stringed instruments, beginning at four on the ukulele, then graduating to guitar and later bass guitar. He quit school at the age of 15 to pursue his profession in a pop band, but soon gravitated to jazz. After seeing an issue of Down Beat where Ray Brown had won the critics' poll for best bass player, Holland went to a record store, and bought a couple of LPs featuring Brown backing pianist Oscar Peterson. He also bought two Leroy Vinnegar albums (Leroy Walks! and Leroy Walks Again) because the bassist was posed with his instrument on the cover. Within a week, Holland traded in his bass guitar for a double bass and began practicing with the records. In addition to Brown and Vinnegar, Holland was drawn to the bassists Charles Mingus and Jimmy Garrison.

After moving to London in 1964, Holland played double bass in small venues and studied with James Edward Merrett, principal bassist of the Philharmonia Orchestra and, later, the BBC Symphony Orchestra. Merrett trained him to sight read and then recommended he apply to the Guildhall School of Music and Drama. Holland received a full-time scholarship for the three-year programme. At 20, Holland was keeping a busy schedule in school, studios and Ronnie Scott's Jazz Club, London's premier jazz club, where he often played in bands that supported such touring American jazz saxophonists as Coleman Hawkins, Ben Webster and Joe Henderson. He also linked up with other British jazz musicians, including guitarist John McLaughlin, saxophonists Evan Parker and John Surman, South Africa-born London-based pianist Chris McGregor, and drummer John Stevens, and performed on the Spontaneous Music Ensemble's 1968 album Karyobin. He also began a working relationship with Canada-born, England-based trumpeter Kenny Wheeler that continued until Wheeler's death in 2014.

With Miles Davis
In 1968, Miles Davis and Philly Joe Jones heard him at Ronnie Scott's Jazz Club, playing in a combo that opened for the Bill Evans Trio. Jones told Holland that Davis wanted him to join his band (replacing Ron Carter). Davis left the UK before Holland could contact him directly, and two weeks later Holland was given three days' notice to fly to New York for an engagement at Count Basie's nightclub. He arrived the night before, staying with Jack DeJohnette, a previous acquaintance. The following day Herbie Hancock took him to the club, and his two years with Davis began. This was also Hancock's last gig as Davis's pianist, as he left afterwards for a honeymoon in Brazil and was replaced by Chick Corea when he could not return for an engagement due to illness. Holland's first recordings with Davis were in September 1968, and he appears on half of the album Filles de Kilimanjaro (with Davis, Corea, Wayne Shorter and Tony Williams).

Holland was a member of Davis's rhythm section through the summer of 1970; he appears on the albums In a Silent Way and Bitches' Brew.  In the first year of his tenure with Davis, Holland played primarily upright bass. By the end of 1969, he played electric bass guitar (often treated with wah-wah pedal and other electronic effects) with greater frequency as Davis moved away from acoustic jazz.

Holland was also a member of Davis's working group during this time, unlike many of the musicians who appeared only on the trumpeter's studio recordings. The so-called "lost quintet" of Davis, Shorter, Corea, Holland and DeJohnette was active in 1969 but never made any studio recordings as a quintet. A 1970 live recording of this group plus percussionist Airto Moreira, Live at the Fillmore East, March 7, 1970: It's About That Time, was issued in 2001. Steve Grossman replaced Shorter in early 1970; Keith Jarrett joined the group as a second keyboardist thereafter, and Gary Bartz replaced Grossman during the summer of 1970. By the end of the summer, rhythm and blues bass guitarist Michael Henderson had replaced Holland.

ECM and the 1970s
After leaving Davis's group, Holland briefly joined the avant-garde jazz group Circle, with Corea, Barry Altschul and reed player Anthony Braxton. This started a decades-long association with the ECM record label. After recording a few albums, Circle disbanded when Corea departed. 1972 saw the recording of Conference of the Birds, with Sam Rivers, Altschul and Braxton – Holland's first recording as a leader, and the beginning of a long musical relationship with Rivers. The title of the album is taken from that of a 4,500-line epic poem by Persian Sufist writer, Farid al-Din Attar.

Holland worked as a leader and as a sideman with many other jazz artists in the 1970s. On June 15, 1972 he played with Thelonious Monk at the Village Vanguard which was one of Monk's last concerts. Holland recorded several important albums with Anthony Braxton between 1972 and 1976 – including New York, Fall 1974 (1974) and Five Pieces (1975) – that were released on Arista Records.
Holland also recorded duo sessions with saxophonist Sam Rivers and fellow bassist Barre Phillips, and the solo bass album Emerald Tears. Also in the 1970s he appeared with performers including Stan Getz and the Gateway Trio with John Abercrombie and DeJohnette. The Gateway trio released two influential modern jazz albums in 1975 and 1977, and reformed in 1994 for a recording session which yielded another two albums. As a sideman, Holland appeared on rock and pop recordings as well, working with singer Bonnie Raitt on her 1972 album Give It Up.

The 1980s 
Holland formed his first working quintet in 1983, and over the next four years released Jumpin' In, Seeds of Time, and The Razor's Edge, featuring alto saxophonist Steve Coleman, trumpeter Wheeler and trombonist Julian Priester (or Robin Eubanks). Subsequently, he formed the Dave Holland Trio (with Coleman and DeJohnette) for the 1988 album Triplicate, and teamed with Coleman, electric guitarist Kevin Eubanks and drummer Marvin "Smitty" Smith for Extensions. He also recorded Life Cycle, an album of compositions played on solo cello.

The bassist also continued to collaborate with his peers, often connecting with figures from the previous generation of jazz icons. In 1989, Holland teamed with drummer Billy Higgins and pianist Hank Jones to record The Oracle, and joined drummer Roy Haynes and guitarist Pat Metheny in 1989 to record Question and Answer.

The 1990s and 2000s 
During the 1990s, Holland renewed an affiliation, begun in the 1970s, with Joe Henderson, joining the tenor saxophonist on So Near (So Far), a tribute to Miles Davis, and Porgy & Bess. Holland also reunited with vocalist Betty Carter, touring and recording the live album Feed the Fire (1993). Fellow Davis alumnus Herbie Hancock invited Holland to tour with him in 1992, subsequently recording The New Standard. Holland joined Hancock's band again in 1996. He was also part of the sessions for River: The Joni Letters, winner of the 2008 Grammy Award for Album of the Year.

As a leader, Holland formed his third quartet and released Dream of the Elders (1995), which introduced the vibraphonist Steve Nelson to his ensembles. Holland formed a quintet that includes tenor saxophonist Chris Potter, trombonist Robin Eubanks and, a more recent addition, drummer Nate Smith. Their recordings include Points of View, Prime Directive, Not for Nothin, Extended Play: Live at Birdland and Critical Mass. In addition to releasing four quintet albums on ECM, Holland debuted his Big Band, which released What Goes Around in 2002. The album won Holland his first Grammy as a leader, in the Best Large Jazz Ensemble Album category. The second Big Band recording, Overtime (2005), again won the Grammy in the Best Large Jazz Ensemble Album category; it was released on Holland's Dare2 label, which he formed that year.

In 2009, Holland was a co-founder of an all-star group called the Overtone Quartet. The group consisted of Holland on bass, Chris Potter on tenor saxophone, Jason Moran on piano, and Eric Harland on drums. The group toured extensively throughout the United States and Europe.

Awards and honors
He won the Critics Poll in Down Beat magazine for Musician of the Year, Big Band of the Year, and Acoustic Bassist of the Year (he also garnered top bassist in the 2006 poll). The Jazz Journalists' Association honored him as Musician and Acoustic Bassist of the Year. He was the recipient of the Miles Davis Award at the Montreal Jazz Festival.

The National Endowment for the Arts named Holland as one of its five Jazz Masters Fellows in 2017; the award recognizes artists for their lifetime achievements and exceptional contributions toward the advancement of jazz.

Holland has received honorary doctorates from the New England Conservatory, Boston, where he held a full-time teaching position in 1987–88 and where he has been visiting artist in residence since 2005; Berklee College of Music, Boston; and the Birmingham Conservatoire, in England. He was also named Fellow of the Guildhall School of Music and Drama (London). From 1982 to 1989, Holland served as the artistic director of the Banff Summer Jazz Workshop through the Banff School of Fine Arts in Alberta, Canada. In addition, he has taught workshops and master classes around the world at universities and music schools and is President of the UK-based National Youth Jazz Collective.

Discography

As leader 
 Conference of the Birds (ECM, 1973) – recorded in 1972
 Emerald Tears (ECM, 1978) – recorded in 1977. solo bass.
 Life Cycle (ECM, 1983) – recorded in 1982. solo cello.
 Jumpin' In (ECM, 1983)
 Seeds of Time (ECM, 1984)
 The Razor's Edge (ECM, 1987)
 Triplicate (ECM, 1988)
 Extensions (ECM, 1990)
 Ones All (VeraBra, 1993) – solo bass
 Dream of the Elders (ECM, 1995) – quartet
 Points of View (ECM, 1998) – quintet
 Prime Directive (ECM, 1999) – quintet
 Not for Nothin' (ECM, 2001) – quintet
 What Goes Around (ECM, 2002) – with big band
 Extended Play: Live at Birdland (ECM, 2003)[2CD] – quintet
 Overtime (Dare2/Sunnyside, 2005) – with big band
 Critical Mass (Dare2/Sunnyside, 2006) – quintet
 Pass It On (Dare2/EmArcy/UMe, 2008) – sextet
 Pathways (Dare2, 2010) – octet
 Prism (Dare2, 2013) – quartet
 Aziza (Dare2, 2016) – quartet
 Uncharted Territories (Dare2, 2018)[2CD] – quartet with Evan Parker
 Without Deception (Dare2, 2020) – recorded in 2019
 Another Land (Edition Records, 2021) – recorded in 2019

Compilation
Rarum, Vol. 10: Selected Recordings (ECM, 2004)

As co-leader 
 with John McLaughlin, John Surman, Stu Martin and Karl Berger – Where Fortune Smiles (Dawn, 1971)
 with Chick Corea and Barry Altschul – ARC (ECM, 1971)
 with Derek Bailey – Improvisations for Cello and Guitar (ECM, 1971)
 with Barre Phillips – Music from Two Basses (ECM, 1971)
 Dave Holland / Sam Rivers (Improvising Artists, 1976)
 Sam Rivers / Dave Holland Vol. 2 (Improvising Artists, 1976)
 Norman Blake/Tut Taylor/Sam Bush/Butch Robins/Vassar Clements/David Holland/Jethro Burns (HDS, 1975)
 with Karl Berger – All Kinds of Time (Sackville, 1976)
 with Evan Parker, Paul Rutherford and Paul Lovens – The Ericle of Dolphi [recorded 1976 and 1986] (Po Torch, 1989)
 Vassar Clements, John Hartford, Dave Holland (Rounder, 1985)
 with Hank Jones and Billy Higgins – The Oracle (EmArcy, 1990)
 with Steve Coleman – Phase Space (Rebel-X/DIW, 1991)
 with Gordon Beck, Jack DeJohnette and Didier Lockwood – For Evans Sake (JMS, 1992)
 with Mino Cinelu and Kevin Eubanks – World Trio (Intuition, 1995)
 ScoLoHoFo (John Scofield, Joe Lovano, Dave Holland and Al Foster) – Oh! (Blue Note, 2003)
 with Gonzalo Rubalcaba, Chris Potter and Eric Harland – The Monterey Quartet: Live at the 2007 Monterey Festival (Monterey Jazz Festival, 2009)
 with Pepe Habichuela – Hands (Dare2, 2010)
 with Sam Rivers and Barry Altschul – Reunion: Live in New York (Pi, 2012)
 with Kenny Barron – The Art of Conversation (Impulse!, 2014)
 with Zakir Hussain and Chris Potter - Good Hope (Edition Records, 2019)

As group 
As Circle
With  Chick Corea and Barry Altschul
 1970: Circle 1: Live in Germany Concert (CBS/Sony Japan, 1970)
 1970: Circling In (Blue Note, 1975)
 1970: Circulus (Blue Note, 1978)
 1971: Circle 2: Gathering (CBS/Sony Japan, 1971)
 1971: Paris Concert (ECM, 1972)

Gateway
With John Abercrombie and Jack DeJohnette
 1975: Gateway (ECM, 1976)
 1977: Gateway 2 (ECM, 1978)
 1994: Homecoming (ECM, 1995)
 1994: In the Moment (ECM, 1996)

As sideman 

With Karl Berger
 Tune In (Milestone, 1969)
 Transit (Black Saint, 1986)
 Crystal Fire (Enja, 1992)
 Conversations (In+Out, 1994)

With Anouar Brahem
 Thimar (ECM, 1998) – recorded in 1997
 Blue Maqams (ECM, 2017)

With Anthony Braxton
 The Complete Braxton (Freedom, 1973) – recorded in 1971
 Town Hall 1972 (Trio, 1972)
 Trio and Duet (Sackville, 1974)
 New York, Fall 1974 (Arista, 1974)
 Five Pieces 1975 (Arista, 1975)
Quartet: Live at Moers Festival (Ring, 1976) – recorded in 1974
 Creative Orchestra Music 1976 (Arista, 1976)
 The Montreux/Berlin Concerts (Arista, 1977) – recorded in 1975–76
 Dortmund (Quartet) 1976 (hatART, 1991)

With Steve Coleman
 Rhythm People (The Resurrection of Creative Black Civilization) (Novus/RCA, 1990)
 Black Science (Novus/RCA, 1991)
 Rhythm in Mind (Novus/RCA, 1991)

With Chick Corea
 1969: Is (Groove Merchant, 1969)
 1969: Sundance (Groove Merchant, 1972)
 1970: The Song of Singing (Blue Note, 1971)

With Miles Davis
 Filles de Kilimanjaro (Columbia, 1968)
 In a Silent Way (Columbia, 1969)
 Bitches Brew (Columbia, 1969)
 Live at the Fillmore East, March 7, 1970: It's About That Time (Columbia, 1970)
 Miles Davis at Fillmore: Live at the Fillmore East (Columbia, 1970)
 Black Beauty: Live at the Fillmore West (Columbia, 1970)
 Live-Evil (Columbia, 1970)
 Big Fun (Columbia, 1969–1972)
 1969 Miles – Festiva De Juan Pins (Columbia, 1993)
 Live in Europe 1969: The Bootleg Series Vol. 2 (Columbia/Legacy, 2013)
 Miles at the Fillmore - Miles Davis 1970: The Bootleg Series Vol. 3 (Columbia/Legacy, 2014)
 Miles Davis at Newport 1955-1975: The Bootleg Series Vol. 4 (Columbia/Legacy, 2015)

With Robin Eubanks
 Karma (JMT, 1991)
 Mental Images (JMT, 1994)

With Herbie Hancock
 The New Standard (Verve, 1996)
 River: The Joni Letters (Verve, 2006)

With Billy Hart
 Enchance (Horizon, 1977)
 Oshumare (Gramavision, 1985)

With Joe Henderson
 Black Is the Color (Milestone, 1972)
 Multiple (Milestone, 1973)
 So Near, So Far (Verve, 1993)
 Porgy & Bess (Verve, 1997)

With Eric Kloss
 To Hear Is to See! (Prestige, 1969)
 Consciousness! (Prestige, 1970)
 One, Two, Free (Muse, 1972)

With Dave Liebman
First Visit (Philips, 1973)
 Fire (Jazzline, 2018) – recorded in 2016

With Joe Lovano
 From the Soul (Blue Note, 1992)
 Trio Fascination: Edition One (Blue Note, 1997)

With Sam Rivers
 Sizzle (Impulse!, 1975)
 Waves (Tomato, 1978)
 Contrasts (ECM, 1981)

With Kenny Wheeler
 Windmill Tilter (Fontana, 1969)
 Gnu High (ECM, 1975)
 Deer Wan (ECM, 1977)
 Double, Double You (ECM, 1984)
 Flutter By, Butterfly (Soul Note, 1988)
 Music for Large & Small Ensembles (ECM, 1990)
 The Widow in the Window (ECM, 1990)
 Angel Song (ECM, 1997)
 What Now? (CAM Jazz, 2005)

With others
 Claudia Acuña, Rhythm of Life (Verve, 2002)
 George Adams, Sound Suggestions (ECM, 1979)
 Geri Allen, The Life of a Song (Telarc, 2004) (with Jack DeJohnette)
 Franco Ambrosetti, Tentets (Enja, 1985)
 Kenny Barron, Scratch (Enja, 1985)
 Terence Blanchard, Wandering Moon (Sony Classical, 2000)
 Paul Bley, Paul Bley & Scorpio (Milestone, 1973)
 Michael Brecker, Tales from the Hudson (Impulse!, 1996)
 Nick Brignola, Baritone Madness (Bee Hive, 1977) with Pepper Adams
 Gary Burton, Like Minds (Concord, 1998)
 Uri Caine, Toys (JMT, 1996)
 Betty Carter, Feed the Fire (Verve, 1993)
 James Carter, The Real Quiet Storm (Atlantic, 1995)
 Vassar Clements, Once In A While (Flying Fish, 1992)
 Joe Farrell, Joe Farrell Quartet (CTI, 1970)
 Bill Frisell, With Dave Holland and Elvin Jones (Nonesuch, 2001)
 Hal Galper, Inner Journey (Mainstream, 1973)
 Laszlo Gardony, The Legend of Tsumi (Antilles, 1989)
 Barry Guy and the London Jazz Composers' Orchestra, Zurich Concerts (Intakt, 1988)
 Jim Hall, Jim Hall & Basses (Telarc, 2001)
 Roy Haynes, Birds of a Feather: A Tribute to Charlie Parker (Dreyfus Jazz, 2001) – Grammy nominated
 Roland Hanna, Child of Gemini (MPS, 1971)
 Mark Isaacs, Encounters, with Roy Haynes (ABC, 1990 & 1995; veraBra, 1991; Gracemusic, 2013)
 Leroy Jenkins, For Players Only (JCOA Records, 1975)
 Charles Lloyd, Voice in the Night (ECM, 1998)
 John Hartford, Morning Bugle (Warner Bros. 1972)
 Lee Konitz, Satori (Milestone, 1974)
 Pat Metheny, Question and Answer (Geffen, 1990) (with Roy Haynes)
 Chris Potter, Unspoken (Concord, 1997)
 Wayne Shorter, Moto Grosso Feio (Blue Note, 1970)
 Tomasz Stańko, Balladyna (ECM, 1976)
 Gary Thomas, While the Gate Is Open (JMT, 1990)
 Collin Walcott, Cloud Dance (ECM, 1975)
 Richard Teitelbaum, Muun Music Universe, Vol. 1: The Peace Church Concerts (CMC/India Navigation, 1974)

Filmography

Concert films
 1992 Renaud Le Van Kim: Miles Davis and Friends (Bravo)
 2000 DeJohnette, Hancock, Holland and Metheny Live in Concert
 2005 Dave Holland Quintet Live in Freiburg
 2008 Herbie Hancock & The New Standard Allstars in Japan (Jazz Door)
 2009 Dave Holland Quintet: Vortex
 2009 Dave Holland Quintet Live from the Zelt-Musik-Festival, Freiburg 1986

Featured in documentaries
 2001 Mike Dibb: The Miles Davis Story (Channel 4)
 2004 Murray Lerner: Miles Electric A Different Kind of Blue (Eagle Rock) about the Isle of Wight Festival 1970

References

External links

 Official website
 Dave Holland on ECM's official website, with reviews
 Dave Hollands ECM recordings on trovar.com
 Audio Interview with Dave Holland
 Review of the album Critical Mass from JazzChicago.net
 Dave Holland: Jazz at the Bass Level, Oregon Music News
 Dave Holland at All About Jazz
 Discography on Discogs

1946 births
Living people
Alumni of the Guildhall School of Music and Drama
Avant-garde jazz musicians
British jazz double-bassists
Male double-bassists
English jazz composers
Male jazz composers
English male composers
Grammy Award winners
Miles Davis
musicians from Wolverhampton
New England Conservatory alumni
New England Conservatory faculty
Big bands
ECM Records artists
Circle (jazz band) members
21st-century double-bassists
Spontaneous Music Ensemble members
Gateway (band) members
Sackville Records artists
Improvising Artists Records artists